XHCARH-FM/XECARH-AM (La Voz del Pueblo Hñahñu – "The Voice of the Hñahñu People") is an indigenous community radio station that broadcasts in Spanish, Hñahñu and Nahuatl from Cardonal in the Mexican state of Hidalgo. It is run by the Sistema de Radiodifusoras Culturales Indígenas (SRCI) of the National Institute of Indigenous Peoples (INPI). It came on air in 1998 as XECARH-AM, a daytime-only station on 1480 AM. In 2012, XECARH was authorized to move to FM XHCARH-FM 89.1. While this station is on the air, XECARH cannot be shut off as it is the last radio service in portions of its AM coverage area where the FM station does not reach.

External links
XECARH website

References

1998 establishments in Mexico
Indigenous radio stations in Mexico
Nahuatl-language radio stations
Otomi-language radio stations
Radio stations established in 1998
Radio stations in Hidalgo (state)
Radio stations in Mexico with continuity obligations
Sistema de Radiodifusoras Culturales Indígenas
Spanish-language radio stations